Smouldering Fires is a 1925 Universal silent drama film directed by Clarence Brown and starring Pauline Frederick and Laura La Plante. The movie's plot is similar to the 1933 talking picture Female, starring Ruth Chatterton.

Copies of this film are archived by UCLA and George Eastman House. In 1953, the film entered the public domain in the United States because the claimants did not renew its copyright registration in the 28th year after publication. It is available on video, and numerous prints exist in private collections.

Plot
As described in a film magazine, Jane Vale (Frederick), a forty year old business woman who ran a great industrial plant left to her by her father, awoke to the realization that she was in love with Robert Elliott (McGregor), a youth scarcely more than half her age. This lad first attracted her attention by opposing her policy in a matter of production. She was passing at the time and heard him refer to her executive staff as "yes" men. Her general manager was for firing the boy on the spot, but instead, she made him her assistant. As a result, gossip spread about the factory through the envious mouths of his fellow employees. Feeling bound by his honor to defend her, on an occasion when a tough employee makes a scurrilous remark, the boy strikes him, knocking him down. Jane sees the fight although she is not seen by any of her workers. Then she gets the thrill of her life when, Elliott, the lad, announces that he is engaged to marry Miss Vale. Just before their marriage, Jane's young sister, Dorothy (La Plante), returns home from college and pays her a visit. The latter is about Elliott's age. The two immediately fall in love with each other, but conceal their growing passion out of love for Jane. Elliott goes through with the marriage, and later, on a mountain climb, circumstances result in Dorothy falling into his arms. It is then that they decide to tell Jane. But again they fail when they realize the pain it will cause her. After a party which was made up of Dorothy's younger friends, Jane discovers that Elliott and Dorothy love each other. Jane pretends that she has fallen out of love with Robert and seeks a divorce. In this way, she paves the way for his freedom and her sister's happiness.

Cast

Reception
Reviewer Hal Erickson wrote that the film "is a first-rate silent 'soap opera', immaculately performed by its superb cast and brilliantly directed."  While praising the American release version, he made note that the "slightly longer European version is even better, with some remarkably mature (albeit non-lurid) setpieces".

In The First Female Stars: Women of the Silent Era, author David W. Menefee writes that the film "presented Pauline (Frederick) in a memorable light, successfully carrying off the role of a woman business executive."

In Movies and American Society, author Steven J. Ross wrote that Smouldering Fires was "a cautionary tale of what happens when businesswomen become too successful."

References

External links

Smouldering Fires at silentera.com
Stills from Smouldering Fires website

1925 films
1925 drama films
Silent American drama films
American black-and-white films
Films directed by Clarence Brown
American silent feature films
Articles containing video clips
1920s American films